Pierre Darmon (born 14 January 1934) is a French former tennis player. He was ranked No.8 in the world in 1963, and also reached the top ten in 1958 and 1964.

Early life
Darmon was born in Tunis, Tunisia. He moved to France at 17 years of age.

Tennis career
Darmon was French national junior champion in 1950. He was France's top-ranked tennis player from 1957 to 1969, and won the national title nine times in that period. He also won the French national doubles championship in 1957 (with Paul Rémy), 1958 (with Robert Haillet), 1961 (with Gérard Pilet), and 1966 (with François Jauffret).

In 1963, Darmon was the runner-up in singles at the French Open, where he beat Manuel Santana in five sets in the semi-finals before losing to Roy Emerson in the final in four sets. Also in 1963, he reached the finals at Wimbledon in doubles, along with partner Jean Claude Barclay.

He was international veterans mixed doubles champion with his wife Rosie Darmon in 1961, and in  1968 and 1975 with Gail Chanfreau.

Davis Cup
Darmon was a member of France's Davis Cup Team from 1956–67, winning 44 of the 68 matches in which he participated. Darmon holds France's record for the most wins and most singles victories.  He played in 34 Davis Cup ties for France, second only to compatriot François Jauffret who played one more. He holds the record for most singles victories by a French Davis Cup player, having had a record of 44-17.

Honors
In 1997 he was inducted into the International Jewish Sports Hall of Fame. In 2002 he received the Davis Cup Award of Excellence. In 2019 the International Tennis Hall of Fame and the International Tennis Federation presented Darmon with  The Golden Achievement Award.

Grand Slam finals

Singles (1 runner-up)

Doubles (1 runner-up)

See also
List of select Jewish tennis players

References

External links
 
 
 
 Wimbledon 1957.https://www.youtube.com/watch?v=o8a906iu2a0

1934 births
Living people
French male tennis players
Jewish tennis players
Olympic tennis players of France
Sportspeople from Tunis
Tunisian Jews
Tennis players at the 1968 Summer Olympics
Tunisian emigrants to France